Chaetotrechiama procerus is a species of beetle in the family Carabidae, the only species in the genus Chaetotrechiama.

References

Trechinae